A ward is the smallest administrative unit of Ethiopia: a ward, a neighbourhood or a localized and delimited group of people. It is part of a district, itself usually part of a zone, which in turn are grouped into one of the regions or two chartered cities that comprise the Federal Democratic Republic of Ethiopia.

Each ward consists of at least 500 families, or the equivalent of 3,500 to 4,000 persons. There is at least one in every town with more than 2,000 population. A district's representative had jurisdiction over to ward.

The ward, also referred to as a peasant association, was created by the Derg in 1975 to promote development and to manage land reform; they became a key element that the rival Ethiopian People's Revolutionary Party and MEISON fought each other, and the ruling Derg, to control during the Ethiopian Red Terror. The wards were retained as administrative units by the Transitional Government of Ethiopia upon the conclusion of the Ethiopian Civil War in 1991; ever since, their administrative role has expanded to include the provision of government services more broadly. As Human Rights Watch noted, ward officials determine eligibility for food assistance, recommend referrals to secondary health care and schools, and help provide access to state-distributed resources such as seeds, fertilizers, credit, and other essential agricultural inputs."

Structure and functions 
The lowest level of local government with limited autonomy there are the kebeles. They are at the neighbourhood level and are the primary contact for most citizens living in Ethiopia. Their administrative unit consists of an elected council, a cabinet (executive committee), a social court and the development and security staff. Kebeles are accountable to their woreda councils and are typically responsible for providing basic education, primary health care, agriculture, water, and rural roads. The kebeles are headed by cadres loyal to the political coalition who see the people's everyday lives. Therefore, they are also excellent for observing movements undesirable for the central government. However, the influence of the bosom is not unlimited and complete. The system is becoming less and less functioning at lower levels in fast-growing urban communities. OPDO in Oromia only introduced the sub-intestinal system in 2001, but it did not fully become operational until the 2005 elections.

See also 
 Subdivisions of Ethiopia

References 

Types of administrative division
Subdivisions of Ethiopia